Fuller Rock is a rock awash, one of the principal dangers to ships on the north side of Faure Passage, Marguerite Bay, Antarctica, about  south-southwest of Dismal Island. It was charted by a Royal Navy Hydrographic Survey Unit from RRS John Biscoe in January 1973 and named after Lieutenant Andrew C. Fuller, Royal Navy, who directed the survey.

References

Rock formations of Graham Land
Fallières Coast